Seacliff railway station is located on the Seaford line. Situated in the south-western Adelaide suburb of Seacliff, it is 17 kilometres from Adelaide station.

History 

Seacliff was opened in 1915. The station originally only had one platform until a second opened in 1976 when the Seaford line was extended to Christie Downs.

The platforms are divided, being located on opposite sides of Wheatland Street to minimise the amount of time the level crossing boom gates have to be down.

Services by platform

Buses 
Buses: 265 via Seacliff Station to Marion.

References 

South Australian Railways Working Timetable book No. 265 30 June 1974

External links

Flickr gallery

Railway stations in Adelaide
Railway stations in Australia opened in 1915